Gautieria monticola is a species of hypogeal fungus in the family Gomphaceae. It was described as new to science in 1884 by American mycologist Harvey Willson Harkness. It is nonpoisonous, but smells strongly of sour milk.

References

Fungi described in 1884
Fungi of the United States
Gomphaceae
Fungi without expected TNC conservation status